Denticetopsis macilenta is a species of whale catfish endemic to Guyana where it is only known from a limited area in the Essequibo River basin.  This species grows to a length of 6.7 cm (2.6 inches).

References 
 

Cetopsidae
Catfish of South America
Endemic fauna of Guyana
Fish of Guyana
Fish described in 1912